Montsûrs is a commune in the Mayenne department in north-western France. On 1 January 2017, it was merged with Saint-Céneré and formed the short-lived commune Montsûrs-Saint-Céneré. Montsûrs-Saint-Céneré was merged with Deux-Évailles, Montourtier and Saint-Ouën-des-Vallons on 1 January 2019, and the new commune took the name of Montsûrs. The river Jouanne flows through the commune.

Points of interest
Arboretum de Montsûrs

See also
Communes of the Mayenne department

References

Communes of Mayenne
Maine (province)